KASF (90.9 FM) is a low transmission power, college level, educational radio station licensed in Alamosa, Colorado, United States, the station serves part of the San Luis Valley in Colorado.  The station is owned by Adams State University.

References

External links

ASF
Radio stations established in 1977